HMS Sheldrake was one of 20  (later H-class) destroyers built for the Royal Navy. The destroyer served in the First World War. The Acorn class were smaller than the preceding  but oil-fired and better armed. Launched in 1910, Sheldrake served with the Second Destroyer Flotilla of the Grand Fleet as an escort, transferring to Malta to serve with the Fifth Destroyer Flotilla as part of the Mediterranean Fleet in 1916. The ship once again served as an escort, protecting ships from submarines and mines, including the troopship , as well as unsuccessfully attempting to rescue the sloop . After the Armistice, the destroyer was reduced to reserve before being sold to be broken up in 1921.

Design and description

After the preceding coal-burning , the s saw a return to oil-firing. Unlike previous destroyer designs, where the individual yards had been given discretion within the parameters set by the Admiralty, the Acorn class were a set, with the propulsion machinery the only major variation between the different ships. This enabled costs to be reduced. The class was later renamed H class.

Displacement was  normal and  full load. Power was provided by Parsons steam turbines, fed by four Yarrow boilers. Parsons supplied a complex of seven turbines, a high-pressure and two low pressure for high speed, two turbines for cruising and two for running astern, driving three shafts. The high-pressure turbine drove the centre shaft, the remainder being distributed amongst two wing-shafts. Three funnels were fitted, the foremost tall and thin, the central short and thick and the aft narrow. On trial, Sheldrake achieved .

The armament consisted of a single BL  Mk VIII gun carried on the forecastle and another aft. Two single QF 12-pounder  guns were mounted between the first two funnels. Two rotating  torpedo tubes were mounted aft of the funnels, with two reloads carried, and a searchlight fitted between the tubes. The destroyer was later modified to carry a single Vickers QF 3-pounder  anti-aircraft gun and depth charges for anti-submarine warfare. The ship's complement was 72 officers and ratings.

Construction and career
The 20 destroyers of the Acorn class were ordered by the Admiralty under the 1909–1910 Naval Programme on 8 September 1909. Sheldrake was laid down at the Dumbarton shipyard of William Denny and Brothers with the yard number 918 on 15 January 1910, launched on 18 January 1911 and completed on 19 May 1911. The ship was the sixth in Royal Navy service to be named after the sheldrake, an alternative name for the shelduck, which had been first used in 1806. On commissioning, the vessel joined the Second Destroyer Flotilla.

After the British Empire declared war on Germany at the beginning of the First World War in August 1914, the Flotilla became part of the Grand Fleet. Between 13 and 15 October, the Flotilla supported the battleships of the Grand Fleet in a practice cruise. Soon afterwards, the destroyers were deployed to Devonport to undertake escort and patrol duties, protecting merchant ships against German submarines. During December 1915, Sheldrake was posted to the Royal Navy base in Malta to operate under Rear Admiral Arthur Limpus. The destroyer escorted a troopship taking soldiers and materiel from Britain, arriving in January 1916.

Sheldrake was assigned to the Fifth Destroyer Flotilla as part of the Mediterranean Fleet. On 23 March 1916, the destroyer rescued 166 crew members and the sole passenger from the horse fodder transport Minneapolis that had been sunk by the German submarine . On 27 April, Sheldrake attempted to tow the sloop , stricken after hitting a mine. However, the poor weather and sloop's increasing list meant that the operation was unsuccessful and the ship sank the following day. For the remainder of the war, the destroyer saw service, frequently escorting troopships including , which sailed with 2,500 troops from Alexandria to Marseilles, on 26 and 27 June, protecting them from submarines and mines. Sometimes simply having an escort was sufficient to deter attack. On 2 June 1917, the ship was escorting the transport Minnetonka when U-35 approached, but could not get close enough to launch an attack due to the presence of the destroyer. On 20 January 1918, Sheldrake was attached to the Aegean Squadron, undertaking patrols as well as escort work.

After the Armistice, the Royal Navy returned to a peacetime level of strength and both the number of ships and the amount of personnel needed to be reduced to save money. Sheldrake joined 57 other destroyers in reserve at the Nore. The vessel was sold to Thos. W. Ward to the broken up at Grays, Essex, on 9 May 1921.

Pennant numbers

References

Citations

Bibliography

1911 ships
Sheldrake (1911)
Ships built on the River Clyde
Sheldrake (1911)